Pseudopostega brevifurcata is a moth of the family Opostegidae. It was described by Donald R. Davis and Jonas R. Stonis, 2007. It is known from the provinces of Heredia and Guanacaste in northern Costa Rica.

The length of the forewings is about 2.7 mm. Adults have been recorded in June and October.

Etymology
The species name is derived from the Latin brevis (meaning short) and furcatus (meaning forked) in reference to the shortened, furcate caudal apex of the male gnathos.

References

Opostegidae
Moths described in 2007